The Robert Mable House and Cemetery is a historic residential building in Mableton, Georgia, now used as the Mable House Arts Center. The plantation plain house was constructed by Robert Mable (1803–1885), an immigrant from Scotland who lived in Savannah, Georgia before buying the  property in Cobb County, Georgia from the Georgia Gold Land Lottery of 1832. He lived in a log cabin before building a sawmill and constructing the home ca. 1843.

The home is operated by the Cobb County Parks, Recreation and Cultural Affairs Department. It is the site of a fall storytelling festival, and is used for school field trips and summer heritage camps. Public tours are offered from June until September. It was added to the National Register of Historic Places on September 1, 1988. It is located at 5239 Floyd Road.

See also
 National Register of Historic Places listings in Cobb County, Georgia

References

External links
 Mable House website
 

Houses on the National Register of Historic Places in Georgia (U.S. state)
Cemeteries on the National Register of Historic Places in Georgia (U.S. state)
Houses completed in 1843
Houses in Cobb County, Georgia
Arts centers in Georgia (U.S. state)
Tourist attractions in Cobb County, Georgia
1843 establishments in Georgia (U.S. state)
Historic districts on the National Register of Historic Places in Georgia (U.S. state)
National Register of Historic Places in Cobb County, Georgia